Chmielewo  is a village in the administrative district of Gmina Stawiski, within Kolno County, Podlaskie Voivodeship, in north-eastern Poland.

The village has a population of 66.

References

Chmielewo